"Sab Kuch Seekha Humne" is a song from the 1959's Hindi film Anari. The song is sung by Mukesh and lyrics written by Shailendra.

Description

Sab Kuch Seekha Humne is a song from the Anari Hindi film which has a duration of 3:40 minutes. Mukesh won the Filmfare Award for Best Male Playback Singer for this song, which was the first Filmfare Award for Playback Singer. The lyrics are penned by Shailendra and the music director is Shankar Jaikishan. In addition, Shailendra won the Filmfare Award for Best Lyricist for lyrics.

Awards

References

Hindi songs
1959 songs
Mukesh (singer) songs